"Scott's Tots" is the twelfth episode of the sixth season of the American comedy television series The Office, and the show's 112th episode overall. The episode was directed by B. J. Novak, his directorial debut for the series, and written by Gene Stupnitsky and Lee Eisenberg. It first aired in the United States on NBC on December 3, 2009.

The series, presented in a mockumentary format, depicts the everyday lives of office employees at the Scranton, Pennsylvania branch of the fictitious Dunder Mufflin Paper Company. In the episode, it is revealed that ten years earlier, Michael (Steve Carell) recklessly promised to pay for the college tuition of an entire local third grade class if they could complete high school. Lacking the personal wealth necessary to fulfill his promise, he and Erin (Ellie Kemper) must go tell the students, who are now high school seniors, that they will not be receiving the money. Meanwhile, in Michael's absence, Dwight (Rainn Wilson) convinces Jim (John Krasinski) to start an employee-of-the-month program with the intention of getting Jim into trouble. The episode achieved a viewership of 8.05 million during its initial airing in the United States.

The episode received critical acclaim, with many calling it a classic Office episode. Gene Stupnitsky and Lee Eisenberg submitted this episode for the 2010 Emmys.

Synopsis
Michael Scott (Steve Carell) realizes he cannot keep a promise he made to a group of underprivileged children ten years ago: that he would pay for their college tuition provided they graduate high school. He reluctantly visits their high school with Erin Hannon (Ellie Kemper) to break the bad news. Michael's promise encouraged the students to excel academically, and they greet Michael with standing applause. When Michael addresses them, he congratulates everyone for being able to graduate from high school, before admitting that he does not have the money to pay for college. Everyone is upset, and Michael fruitlessly attempts to calm them by offering them laptop batteries. One of the students follows Michael outside to tell him what he did was “messed up,” and Michael offers to at least pay for his books if he attends college.

In the car on the way back to the office, Michael continues to lament his promise, but Erin comforts him by pointing out that this group of students have a much higher graduation rate, and that, at the very least, will help them significantly. Michael then warms up to Erin, telling her she is doing a good job and asking about her future plans. He then relates to her that Kevin Malone (Brian Baumgartner) was originally going to be hired to work in the warehouse, but Michael saw "something" in him and made him their new accountant instead, which Erin wants to be; the two drive on singing happily.

Meanwhile, on a suggestion from Andy Bernard (Ed Helms), Jim Halpert (John Krasinski) starts an employee of the month program to increase office morale. Dwight Schrute (Rainn Wilson), however, schemes to get Jim fired. He gives Jim a performance sheet to determine the employee of the month, using complete anonymity to ensure a fair and unbiased assessment. Dwight also collects money from each of the employees as part of a cash prize, even though Jim did not authorize this. At the conclusion of the day, Jim announces the employee of the month, and it is revealed that he apparently picked himself by accident. Everyone starts blaming Jim for using this gimmick as a ploy to take money away from the office. Jim tries to pin part of the failure on Dwight, but since he has taken numerous precautions to protect himself from direct blame, he passively fires back. Jim decides to forgo the award and give it to the next best employee, but things are only made worse when that person is revealed to be his wife Pam (Jenna Fischer). Everyone reaches their breaking point when a cake is delivered to the office with Jim's face on it, and with the words "It Could Only Be You."

With the primary part of his plan a success, having manipulated the assessment and ordered the cake, Dwight initiates the second part of his plan by calling CFO David Wallace (Andy Buckley) multiple times, each time pretending to be a different employee complaining about Jim's failed program. An angry David calls Jim back and chews him out for the mishap. Almost assured that this will get Jim fired, Dwight listens in to the phone conversation from the pen recorder he had left in Jim's office in a previous episode ("The Lover"). But instead of firing Jim, David apologizes to him for losing his temper and praises Jim, adding that David and his wife are "still on" to go out with Jim and Pam. Angry that his plan has not worked, Dwight returns to the drawing board. At the end of the episode, Ryan Howard (B. J. Novak) confronts Dwight with Dwight's "Diabolical Plan" document he found, but expresses his desire to also get Jim fired. The two form an alliance.

Reception
"Scott's Tots" first aired on NBC on December 3, 2009. In its original American broadcast, the episode was viewed by an estimated 8.055 million viewers and received a 4.1 rating/11 percent share in the 18–49 demographic. This means that it was seen by 4.1 percent of all 18- to 49-year-olds, and 11 percent of all 18- to 49-year-olds watching television at the time of the broadcast. In addition, the episode ranked first in its half-hour timeslot and was the highest-rated NBC series of the night.

Dan Phillips of IGN gave the episode a 9.4 out of 10 rating, denoting an "amazing" episode. It was also the highest score given to any sixth-season episode by the site. Phillips called the episode "an instant classic and another phenomenal installment of this season, which hit some rough patches but seems to have recovered brilliantly", especially pointing out the scene between Michael and the irate students. Phillips felt that the main scene between Michael and the children was pivotal and that it "might just rank atop The Offices long list and rich history of uncomfortable yet hilarious moments".

Joel Keller of The Huffington Post wrote that "as the kids from that third-grade class praised Michael and told him how much his gift meant to them, all I could think of was, 'this is so wrong.' [...] The pain on Michael's face was palpable. I had the same expression." He, however, was more critical of the episode's subplot, noting that he was "getting tired of Dwight's diabolical plans". He felt that Jim should have caught onto Dwight's plan, rather than fall for it. Keller ultimately concluded that the episode was "a solid job this week. Not the best of the season, but not bad, either."

Nathan Rabin of The A.V. Club called the episode "kick-ass" and awarded it an "A−". Rabin commended the fact that Michael's bad-idea-for-the-right-reason made him likable. Furthermore, he noted that both Michael and the kids engaged in "mutually beneficial self-deception"; the former thought he could save those in need, and the latter had something to look forward to. Rabin also enjoyed the subplot involving Jim and Dwight, noting that it "afforded [actor Rainn Wilson] an opportunity to do surprisingly accurate, unconscionably mean impersonations of Stanley and Toby".

Several critics, on the other hand, felt that the main plot was too mean to be humorous. Gage Henry of Paste felt that the episode was weak because "one [of its storylines was] rather flimsy and the other ending up too atrocious to watch." He noted that the formula of "Jim tries to conduct one normal day at the office while Michael is out making an ass of himself somewhere" was "becoming bland". Ultimately, however, he could not decide if the episode "was commendably funny, or if it was as humorous as a child realizing that Santa Claus doesn’t exist." Henry graded the episode a 6 out of 10. Steve Marsi at TVFanatic did not enjoy it and was succinct in his review: "Last night's 'Scott's Tots' was not one of The Offices best. [...] it was actually a little depressing. Promising kids college tuition, then yanking it away?"

The episode has become notorious among fans of the show as one of its most awkward and uncomfortable episodes. Jenna Fischer and Angela Kinsey discussed the episode with B. J. Novak for their Office Ladies podcast on April 13, 2022.

References

External links
 "Scott's Tots" at NBC.com
 
 

2009 American television episodes
The Office (American season 6) episodes